Almiro Bergamo (20 September 1912 – 4 July 1994) was an Italian rower who competed in the 1936 Summer Olympics. He was, with Guido Santin, four times Italian champion and two times European champion with the coxed pairs (Italian duecon) rowing. He was born and died in Cavallino-Treporti.

In 1936 he won the silver medal as crew member of the Italian boat in the coxed pair event.

In 1985, he was nominated Italian Republic Knight by Sandro Pertini. He died on 4 July 1994 watching television during Italy vs Nigeria of Usa'94 soccer match.

References

External links
 
 
 
 

1912 births
1994 deaths
Italian male rowers
Olympic rowers of Italy
Rowers at the 1936 Summer Olympics
Olympic silver medalists for Italy
Sportspeople from the Metropolitan City of Venice
Olympic medalists in rowing
Medalists at the 1936 Summer Olympics
European Rowing Championships medalists